The 2022 Horizon League women's soccer tournament was the postseason women's soccer tournament for the Horizon League. It was held from October 30 through November 5, 2022. The quarterfinals of the tournament were held at campus sites, while semifinals and final took place at Engelmann Field in Milwaukee, Wisconsin. The six team single-elimination tournament consisted of three rounds based on seeding from regular season conference play. The Milwaukee Panthers were the defending champions, and they successfully defended their title by beating the Youngstown State Penguins 1–0 in the final. This was the fifteenth overall title for Milwaukee and first for head coach Kevin Boyd.  This was also Milwaukee's fifth consecutive title. As tournament champions, Milwaukee earned the Horizon League's automatic berth into the 2022 NCAA Division I women's soccer tournament.

Seeding 
Six Horizon League schools participated in the tournament. Teams were seeded by conference record.  A tiebreaker was required to determine the third and fourth seeds as Oakland and Wright State both finished with a 5–2–3 regular season conference record.  Oakland was awarded the third seed due to their 3–1 regular season victory over Wright State on October 16.

Bracket

Semifinal matchups were determined by the results of the quarterfinals. The #1 seed would play the lowest-remaining seed, while the #2 seed would play the other quarterfinal winner.

Schedule

Quarterfinals

Semifinals

Final

Statistics

Goalscorers

All-Tournament team

Source:

MVP in bold

References 

Tournament
Horizon League Women's Soccer Tournament